Jerome Hiler (born 1943) is an American experimental filmmaker, painter and stained glass artist.

Biography 
Hiler began his filmmaking career alongside Robert Cowan, as a projectionist at The Filmmaker Cinematheque at 125 West 41st St. in New York City. He was the first projectionist for Andy Warhol's The Chelsea Girls, and went on to project that film more than 150 times.

Hiler creates experimental films. An Artforum review by P. Adams Sitney of his 2011 film, Words of Mercury, described Hiler as part of the "rare company of significant if almost invisible filmmakers of the American avant-garde cinema." Manohla Dargis of The New York Times wrote that Hiler's "output is limited but stunning." Wheeler Winston Dixon has described his films as works in which “everyday objects, places, things and people are transformed into integers of light, creating a sinuous tapestry of restless imagistic construction”.

Since the 1960s, Hiler's partner has been fellow filmmaker Nathaniel Dorsky, with whom he collaborates at times on films.

Filmography 

 Fool’s Spring (Two Personal Gifts) [co-made with Nathaniel Dorsky] (1966)
Library [co-made with Nathaniel Dorsky] (1970)
Gladly Given (1997)
Target Rock (2000)
Music Makes a City (2010)
Words of Mercury (2011)
In the Stone House (1967-70/2012)
New Shores (1979-90/2012)
Misplacement (2013)
Bagatelle II (1964-2016)
Marginalia (2016)

References 

1943 births
Living people
American experimental filmmakers